Alecia Elliott (born December 25, 1982) is an American contemporary country music singer and actress.  She was discovered by Lorrie Morgan, who was impressed by her demo recordings in the mid-1990s. Elliott issued her first studio recording on MCA Nashville in 2000 entitled I'm Diggin' It. As an actress, Elliott was one of the stars of the TNBC series All About Us, of which she also co-wrote its theme song. She returned in 2019 with a new record label, and new music.

In December 2019, Alecia Elliott returned to music with a new single called "What Love Can Do" under Muscle Shoals Recordings. It is her first single since 2001. Her second studio album, Voodoo, was released in September 2020. As of September 2021, "Voodoo" had been removed from all streaming platforms.

Discography

Albums

Singles

Music videos

References

1965 births
American women country singers
American country singer-songwriters
American television actresses
Living people
People from Muscle Shoals, Alabama
MCA Records artists
Country musicians from Alabama
21st-century American women
Singer-songwriters from Alabama